Notes of a Native Son is a collection of ten essays by James Baldwin, published in 1955, mostly tackling issues of race in America and Europe. The volume, as his first non-fiction book, compiles essays of Baldwin that had previously appeared in such magazines as Harper's Magazine, Partisan Review, and The New Leader.

Notes of a Native Son is widely regarded as a classic of the black autobiographical genre. The Modern Library placed it at number 19 on its list of the 100 best 20th-century nonfiction books.

Autobiographical notes
In spite of his father wanting him to be a preacher, Baldwin says he had always been a writer at heart. He tried to find his path as a black writer; although he was not European, American culture is informed by that culture too—moreover he had to grapple with other black writers. Furthermore, Baldwin emphasizes the importance of his desire to be a good man and writer.

Part One

"Everybody's Protest Novel"
Baldwin castigates Harriet Beecher Stowe's Uncle Tom's Cabin for being too sentimental, and for depicting black slaves as praying to a white God so as to be cleansed and whitened. He proceeds to repudiate Richard Wright's Native Son for portraying Bigger Thomas as an angry black man, viewing this as an example of stigmatizing categorization.

"Many Thousands Gone" 
Baldwin offers a sharp critique of Richard Wright's Native Son, citing its main character, Bigger Thomas, as unrealistic, unsympathetic and stereotypical.

"Carmen Jones: The Dark Is Light Enough" 
Baldwin criticises Carmen Jones, a film adaptation of Carmen using an all-black cast. Baldwin is unhappy that the characters display no connection to the condition of blacks and sees it as no coincidence that the main characters have lighter complexions.

Part Two

"The Harlem Ghetto" 
Baldwin points out that the rent is very expensive in Harlem. Moreover, although there are black politicians, the President is white. On to the black press, Baldwin notes that it emulates the white press, with its scandalous spreads and so forth. However the black Church seems to him to be a unique forum for the spelling out of black injustice. Finally, he ponders on antisemitism amongst blacks and comes to the conclusion that the frustration boils down to Jews being white and more powerful than Negroes.

"Journey to Atlanta" 
Baldwin tells the story that happened to The Melodeers, a group of jazz singers (including two of Baldwin's brothers) employed by the Progressive Party to sing in Southern Churches. However, once in Atlanta, Georgia, they were used for canvassing until they refused to sing at all and were returned to their hometown. Baldwin concludes the section by writing that the Melodeers were “not particularly bitter toward the Progressive Party, though they can scarcely be numbered among its supporters.”

"Notes of a Native Son" 
Baldwin paints a vivid recollection of his time growing up with a paranoid father who was dying of tuberculosis, and his initial experience with Jim Crow style segregation. Prior to his father's death, Baldwin was befriended by a white teacher whom his father disapproved of. Later he worked in New Jersey and was often turned down in segregated places—Baldwin recalls a time he hurled a cup half full of water at a waitress in a diner only to realize his actions could have dire consequences. He goes on to say that blacks participating in military service in the South often got abused. Finally, he recounts his father's death which occurred just before his mother gave birth to one of his sisters; his father's funeral was on his 19th birthday, the same day as the Harlem Riot of 1943.

Part Three

"Encounter on the Seine: Black Meets Brown" 
Baldwin compares Black Americans to Blacks in France. Whilst Blacks in France have a history and a country to hold on to, Black Americans don't—their history lies in the United States and it is in the making.

"A Question of Identity" 
Baldwin explains how American students living in Paris are shocked when they arrive and are eager to return home.

"Equal in Paris" 
Baldwin recounts getting arrested in Paris over the Christmas period in 1949, after an acquaintance of his had stolen a bed sheet from a hotel, which he had used. The essay stresses his cultural inability to know how to behave with the police.

"Stranger in the Village" 
Baldwin looks back to his time in a village in Switzerland—how he was the first black man most of the other villagers had ever seen. He goes on to reflect that blacks from European colonies are still mostly located in Africa, while the United States has been fully informed by blacks.

References

1955 non-fiction books
African-American autobiographies
African-American diaspora in Paris
Essay collections by James Baldwin
Beacon Press books
Books about race and ethnicity